Slangkop Lighthouse is a lighthouse near the town of Kommetjie, near Cape Town, South Africa.

History
Construction was due to be completed in 1914 and a brass sign was commissioned for this date, but due to the First World War the lighthouse was not completed until 1919, although definitely in use before that date, e.g. noted in the log of HMS Himalaya on 19 July 1917. The lighthouse was inaugurated on 4 March 1919. The white circular iron tower stands 33m high.

The lighthouse is a tourist attraction for those visiting the area.

Gallery

See also

 List of lighthouses in South Africa
 List of heritage sites in South Africa

References

External links

Video taken from Slangkop Lighthouse on YouTube

Lighthouses completed in 1919
Lighthouses in South Africa
Monuments and memorials in South Africa
Buildings and structures in the Western Cape